Songs is the second album by singer-songwriter Regina Spektor. The album was recorded in its entirety on Christmas Day of 2001; each song was recorded in one take. Copies of the self-released album were sold at Spektor's early live shows. The album is still sold at shows. This is the only one of Spektor's albums not to appear on streaming services, though many of the tracks can be heard on the 2006 compilation album Mary Ann Meets the Gravediggers and Other Short Stories.

Track listing

A different version of the song "Samson" can also be found as the third track of her album Begin to Hope.
A new version of the song "Ne Me Quitte Pas" (re-titled as "Don't Leave Me (Ne Me Quitte Pas)") can be found on her album What We Saw From The Cheap Seats.

Personnel
Regina Spektor – vocals, piano
Chelsea Horenstein – photography
Ryan B Curtis – layout design

References

2002 albums
Regina Spektor albums
Self-released albums